Denys Rebryk (born 4 April 1985) is a Ukrainian footballer currently under contract for Hungarian side Ceglédi VSE.

External links
Profile at HLSZ 

1985 births
Living people
Sportspeople from Uzhhorod
Hungarian people of Ukrainian descent
Ukrainian footballers
Association football forwards
FC Hoverla Uzhhorod players
Vasas SC players
Jászberényi SE footballers
Lombard-Pápa TFC footballers
BFC Siófok players
Ceglédi VSE footballers
Nemzeti Bajnokság I players
Ukrainian expatriate footballers
Expatriate footballers in Hungary
Ukrainian expatriate sportspeople in Hungary
Association football midfielders
Sportspeople from Zakarpattia Oblast